Limnonectes kadarsani is a species of frog in the family Dicroglossidae. It is endemic to Indonesia where it is found in the Lesser Sunda Islands. Specifically, it has been recorded from Lombok, Sumbawa, Flores, and Adonara. Its natural habitats are tropical primary and secondary wet and dry forests where it occurs around forested streams. It is a relatively common frog. It is not considered threatened by the IUCN although potential threats include exploitation for food, water pollution from agriculture, and forest clearing.

References

kadarsani
Amphibians of Indonesia
Endemic fauna of Indonesia
Amphibians described in 1996
Taxonomy articles created by Polbot